"Astounded" is a song by Canadian musical collective Bran Van 3000 featuring vocals from American artist Curtis Mayfield. The song contains interpolations from Mayfield's song "Move On Up" and also contains a sample and an interpolated melody of The Doobie Brothers' "Rockin' Down the Highway".

The song was first released for download on Bran Van 3000's website in January 2001. It was then officially released later the same year as the lead single from their second studio album, Discosis. The single was successful in Canada, receiving heavy airplay on MuchMusic and reaching number three on the Canadian Singles Chart. Outside Canada, the song reached the top 40 in Finland, Italy, the Netherlands, and the United Kingdom; in the latter country, it peaked at number two on the UK Dance Chart. The song was among Canada's 40 most played radio tracks in 2001 and

Background
Bran Van 3000 member James Di Salvio approached Curtis Mayfield with the idea of collaborating months before his death in 1999. Mayfield was too ill to contribute a vocal, but weeks before his death, he gave Di Salvio permission to pull through his archives, which is where he discovered an unused vocal Mayfield recorded in the 1980s. With Mayfield's permission, that vocal was incorporated into "Astounded."

Music video
The music video was directed by Paul Street and premiered in May 2001. The entire video focuses on a couple french kissing and features shots of Montreal with the Olympic Stadium in the background. The video features a cameo by Benicio Del Toro.

Track listings

Canadian and European maxi-CD single
 "Astounded" (long radio edit) – 3:54
 "Astounded" (album version) – 5:57
 "Astounded" (MJ Cole radio edit) – 3:47
 "Astounded" (Eric Kupper radio mix) – 3:42

UK CD single
 "Astounded" (long radio edit) – 3:54
 "Astounded" (album version) – 5:56
 "Astounded" (MJ Cole Master Mix) – 6:21

European CD single
 "Astounded" (long radio edit) – 3:54
 "Astounded" (album version) – 5:57

European 12-inch vinyl
A1. "Astounded" (album version) – 5:57
B1. "Astounded" (MJ Cole Master Mix) – 6:21
B2. "Astounded" (Eric Kupper club mix) – 7:25

Credits and personnel
Credits are lifted from the maxi-CD single liner notes and the Discosis album booklet.

Studio
 Mixed at Olympic Studios (London, England)

Personnel

 James Di Salvio – writing, production
 Gary McKenzie – writing
 Curtis Mayfield – writing, vocals
 Dominique Grand – writing, production, engineering, string arrangement
 Sylvain Grand – writing, production, engineering, string arrangement

 Ric Ocasek – production
 Mark "Spike" Stent – mixing
 Rod Shearer – engineering
 Martin Rouillard – engineering
 Craig Aaronson – executive production

Charts

Weekly charts

Year-end charts

Release history

In popular culture
The song is featured on the soundtrack of the EA Sports video game FIFA Street 2.

References

2001 singles
2001 songs
Bran Van 3000 songs
Grand Royal singles
Song recordings produced by Ric Ocasek
Songs written by Curtis Mayfield
Virgin Records singles